Praolia citrinipes is a species of beetle in the family Cerambycidae. It was described by Henry Walter Bates in 1884. It is known from Japan.

Subspecies
 Praolia citrinipes ishigakiana (Ohbayashi N., 1970)
 Praolia citrinipes atripennis Pic, 1923
 Praolia citrinipes umui Kusama & Takakuwa, 1984
 Praolia citrinipes citrinipes Bates, 1884
 Praolia citrinipes takeuchii Ohmoto, 1990

References

Saperdini
Beetles described in 1884